Vorța is a commune in Hunedoara County, Transylvania, Romania. It is composed of seven villages: Certeju de Jos (Alsócsertés), Coaja (Kózsa), Dumești (Dumesd), Luncșoara (Lunksora), Valea Poienii (until 1960 Băgara; Füzesdbogara), Visca (Viszka) and Vorța.

References

Communes in Hunedoara County
Localities in Transylvania